Flashing Fangs is a 1926 American silent drama film directed by Henry McCarty and starring Lotus Thompson, Eddy Chandler and Ada Mae Vaughn. It was made a showcase for Ranger the Dog, one of many canine stars active in silent films during the decade.

Cast
 Ranger the Dog as 	Ranger, a Dog
 Robert Ramsey as 	Dan Emory
 Lotus Thompson as 	Bessie Lang
 Eddy Chandler as 'Red' Saunders
 Clark Comstock as Andrew Lang
 Ada Mae Vaughn as June
 George Reehm as Sheriff
 Mary Dow as 	Baby

References

Bibliography
 Connelly, Robert B. The Silents: Silent Feature Films, 1910-36, Volume 40, Issue 2. December Press, 1998.
 Munden, Kenneth White. The American Film Institute Catalog of Motion Pictures Produced in the United States, Part 1. University of California Press, 1997.

External links
 

1926 films
1926 drama films
1920s English-language films
American silent feature films
Silent American drama films
Films directed by Henry McCarty
American black-and-white films
Film Booking Offices of America films
1920s American films